Earl St Vincent was launched at Yarmouth in 1798. She entered Lloyd's Register in 1798 with W. Coville, master, and J. Sayers, owner. She then spent most of her early career trading with the Baltic. Earl St Vincent was reported to have been lost off Malta in 1802 while sailing from Zante to London. However, as the table below shows, this report appears to have been in error. 

The two sources for the table (Lloyd's Register and the Register of Shipping agree in broad outline, but there are many discrepancies. The registers are only as accurate as the information owners cared to provide.) By 1815 the data in the two registers had converged. In 1820 she underwent a thorough repair, and in 1827 a small repair. Earl St Vincent was still listed in 1835 as a coaster operating out of Lynn, with J. Turner, master, and Everard and Co., owners. She also underwent another large repair in 1835. She again underwent a small repair in 1837.

Earl St Vincent was listed in 1845 sailing as a coaster out of Lynn, as she had been since c. 1807 when Everard & Co. had purchased her. She was last listed in 1846 with Bircham, master, and Everard, owner, but without a trade.

Citations

1798 ships
Age of Sail merchant ships
Merchant ships of the United Kingdom